James Bernard McHale [J.B.] (December 17, 1875 – June 17, 1959) was a reserve center fielder in Major League Baseball who played briefly for the Boston Red Sox during the 1908 season. A native  of Miners Mills, Pennsylvania, he attended Saint Mary's College of California.

In a 21-game career, McHale was a .224 hitter (15-for-67) with nine runs, two doubles, two triples, four stolen bases and seven RBI. He did not hit any home runs. In 19 outfield appearances, he posted a .970 fielding percentage (one error in 33 chances).

McHale died in Los Angeles, California at age 83.

References

External links

Boston Red Sox players
Major League Baseball center fielders
Saint Mary's Gaels baseball players
Baseball players from Pennsylvania
1875 births
1959 deaths
Anaconda Serpents players
Butte Miners players
Butte Fruit Pickers players
Seattle Siwashes players
Portland Giants players
Portland Beavers players
Providence Grays (minor league) players
Stockton Millers players
San Francisco Seals (baseball) players